"It Never Rains in Southern California" is a 1972 song jointly written and composed by Albert Hammond and Mike Hazlewood and sung by Hammond, a British-born singer-songwriter.

Lyrics content
The lyrics of "It Never Rains In Southern California" tell a first-person story of a showbiz aspirant whose attempts to break into entertainment were failures, but who wants to hide that fact from those he had left behind to pursue his dreams.

Though Hammond's and Hazlewood's lyrics do not actually specify the narrator's living conditions, it can be inferred that he was found homeless and penniless, a humiliation he would naturally be unwilling to reveal to those he had left behind.

Recording
Hammond collaborated with Don Altfeld to produce the selection when he recorded it.

Instrumental backing was provided by L.A. session musicians from the Wrecking Crew. The song appears on Hammond's debut album of the same name and peaked at number five on the US Billboard Hot 100 chart. It is Hammond's only top 10 hit to date (although he would have one other top 40 hit in 1974 with "I'm a Train").

In 1989, Hammond re-recorded the song for his Best of Me greatest hits compilation.

Chart performance

Weekly charts

Albert Hammond version

Year-end charts

Saori Minami version

Trent Summar and the New Row Mob version

References

External links
 Lyrics of this song at LetsSingIt
 

1972 songs
1972 singles
2000 singles
Albert Hammond songs
Songs about California
Songs about weather
Songs written by Albert Hammond
Songs written by Mike Hazlewood
Sonny & Cher songs
Trent Summar & the New Row Mob songs
Oricon International Singles Chart number-one singles
Columbia Records singles